Donald Oberdorfer Jr. (May 28, 1931 – July 23, 2015) was an American professor at the Paul H. Nitze School of Advanced International Studies (SAIS) at Johns Hopkins University with a specialty in Korea, and was a journalist for 38 years, 25 of them with The Washington Post. He is the author of five books and several academic papers. His book on Mike Mansfield, Senator Mansfield: The Extraordinary Life of a Great American Statesman and Diplomat, won the D.B. Hardeman Prize in 2003.

Career
Oberdorfer graduated from Princeton University and went to South Korea as a U.S. Army lieutenant after the signing of the armistice that ended the Korean War. In 1955 he joined The Charlotte Observer, and eventually found a job with The Washington Post. During the next 25 years, he worked for The Post, serving as White House correspondent, Northeast Asia correspondent, and diplomatic correspondent. He retired from the paper in 1993.

At the Nitze school, beyond his teaching position, Oberdorfer served as chairman of the U.S.-Korea Institute from its inauguration in 2006. and was named chairman emeritus in 2013.

Personal
Oberdorfer was married to the former Laura Klein.  He had two children, Daniel and Karen Oberdorfer, and a brother, Eugene.

Bibliography

Tet!, (Doubleday, 1971) . Finalist for the National Book Award.
The Turn: From the Cold War to the New Era, Poseidon Press, October 1, 1991, .
Published in an updated edition as From the Cold War to the New Era: The United States and the Soviet Union, 1983-1991, The Johns Hopkins University Press, 1998, .
Princeton University: The First 250 Years, Princeton University Press, October 30, 1995, .
The Two Koreas: A Contemporary History, Perseus Books, October 1, 1997, .
Published in a revised and updated edition, Basic Books, February 5, 2002, .
Published in a revised and updated third edition, Basic Books, December 10, 2013, . Co-authored with Robert Carlin. 
Senator Mansfield: The Extraordinary Life of a Great American Statesman and Diplomat, Smithsonian Books, October 1, 2003, .

Selected articles and papers
Don Oberderfer and Donald Gregg, "A Moment to Seize With North Korea", Washington Post, June 22, 2005
Don Oberdorfer, "The United States and South Korea: Can This Alliance Last?", Policy Forum Online, November 17, 2005.
Don Oberdorfer and Hajime Izumi, "The United States, Japan, and the Korean Peninsula: Coordinating Policies and Objectives".
Don Oberdorfer, "Hue Red Report Found", Milwaukee Sentinel, December 6, 1969. Sentinel

References

External links
The Don Oberdorfer Papers: 1983-1990
"ROK-US Alliance Is In Trouble: Scholar" The Korea Times, November 3, 2005.
Multimedia: Keynote Address for the Foreign Policy Research Institute.
Don Oberdorfer Papers at Seeley G. Mudd Manuscript Library, Princeton University

Muskie Oral Histories Interview of Don Oberdorfer by Don Nicoll, audio and text, June 19, 2001.

American male journalists
Writers from Atlanta
Princeton University alumni
Johns Hopkins University faculty
1931 births
2015 deaths
The Washington Post people